Miss Philippines Earth 2010 was the 10th edition of the Miss Philippines Earth pageant. It was held on April 24, 2010, at the Aquatica, Manila Ocean Park, Manila, Philippines. Miss Philippines Earth 2009 Sandra Seifert crowned Kris Psyche Resus from Infanta as her successor and represented the Philippines in the international Miss Earth 2010 beauty pageant, was held in Vietnam. 
  
The event was aired by ABS-CBN in the Philippines at 9:00 in the evening on April 25, 2010, and was shown internationally via The Filipino Channel.

Aside from the Miss Philippines Earth 2010 grand title, four other titles of equal importance and with the same rank were crowned. Angela Lauren Fernando was crowned as Miss Philippines Eco Tourism 2010, Miss Philippines Fire 2010 was Gwennaelle Ruais, Miss Philippines Air 2010 was Renee Rosario McHugh, and Miss Philippines Water 2010 was Emmerie Dale Cunanan.

Carousel Productions, the organizer of Miss Philippines Earth, changed the ranking of the runners up and winners since last year. The judges selected 10 finalists who competed for the top five. They vied for the grand crown (Miss Philippines Earth) and the four other equal crowns. The remaining five finalists who failed to advance in the Top 5 served as the Runners-up of the pageant.

Results
Color keys

Notes: 
 Starting 2009, the four elemental court of the Miss Philippines Earth winner, namely Miss Philippines- Air, Miss Philippines- Water, Miss Philippines- Fire, and Miss Philippines Eco-Tourism were all equal winners and the remaining five finalists who failed to advance in the top five were the runners-up of the pageant.

Special awards

 Major Special Awards
 Minor/Sponsor Special Awards

Contestants
The following is the list of the official contestants of Miss Philippines Earth 2010 representing various cities, municipalities, and Filipino communities internationally:

Angono, Rizal - Alyssa Angelaine D. Tolentino 
Antipolo - Pamela Bianca M. de Leon 
Bacolod - Kristine G. Alonso 
Bacoor, Cavite - Sherrie Beth L. Catapia 
Bongabong, Oriental Mindoro - Abbygale D. Rey 
Bongao, Tawi-Tawi - Kriskate D. Lee 
Butuan - Stephany Dianne D. Stefanowitz 
Cagayan de Oro - Lilyka Vic P. Peñaranda 
Cainta, Rizal - Maria Sofia Gloria G. Mustonen 
Calamba, Laguna - Princess A. Sardin 
Caloocan - Sheryl Jane O. Taguiam  
Cavite City - Amor Arahan  
Cebu City - Sian Elizabeth S. Maynard 
Dasmariñas, Cavite - Charisse Marie Sisperez
France (Fil) - Gwennaelle R. Ruais
Gumaca, Quezo - Kris E. Ortiz 
Imus, Cavite - Christine Weizel O. Gulfan 
Infanta, Quezon - Kris Psyche Resus
Iriga City - Aizza Francesca V. Briñas 
Kabacan, North Cotabato - Lady Lou S. Garidan 
Kawit, Cavite - Pauline D. Dollaga 
Lubao, Pampanga - Angela Lauren Fernando
Makati - Angelica C. Pasumbal 
Malabon - Kimberly Ann S. Brandon
Marikina - Hannah Marie R. Landan 
Mexico, Pampanga - Eloisa B. Navarro 
Meycauayan, Bulacan - Christine E. Hermoso 
Navotas - Diane Jane D. Nicolas 
Olongapo - Rosemary Joan G. Turner 
Olutanga, Zamboanga Sibugay - Sheena U. Arabani 
Pandan, Antique - Emmerie Dale M. Cunanan
Pasay - Julia Katrina M. Ibuna 
Puerto Galera, Oriental Mindoro - Crissia A. Atienza 
Puerto Princesa - Rosemary Sampaguita T. Jasper 
Quezon City - Nadine Bendigo 
Romblon - Ma. Rizel A. Macasa 
San Fernando, La Union - Brendolf T. Muñoz 
San Jose del Monte, Bulacan - Lorraine G. Asis 
San Pedro, Laguna - Apple M. Ramos 
Taft, Eastern Samar - Rosjane A. Tiunayan 
Tagaytay, Cavite - Nadine Karla B. de Roxas 
Taguig - Nicole K. Ortega 
Tanauan, Batangas - Sarah Jane P. Mercado 
Tarlac City - Aura Donna L. Garon 
United States Central (Fil.) - Therese Anne Meelheib 
United States East Coast (Fil.) - Renee Rosario A. McHugh
United States West Coast (Fil.) - Melissa Ann C. Sokukawa
Vigan City - Marie Loraine Diane D. de Guzman
Virac, Catanduanes - Aiza Angelica T. delos Santos

Judges

See also
Miss Earth 2010

References

External links
Official Website
Lil' Earth Angels Official Website  Shaina Rae N. Sanguyo(Grand Winner)
Woman of the Earth

2010
2010 beauty pageants
2010 in the Philippines
April 2010 events in the Philippines